Sebastián Gembický (born 25 April 2001) is a Slovak footballer who last played as a forward or a winger for Fortuna Liga club Zemplín Michalovce.

Club career

Zemplín Michalovce
Gembický made his Slovak league debut for Zemplín Michalovce against DAC 1904 Dunajská Streda on 25 July 2021.

References

External links
 MFK Zemplín Michalovce official club profile 
 
 
 Futbalnet profile 

2001 births
Living people
Sportspeople from Rimavská Sobota
Slovak footballers
Slovakia youth international footballers
Association football forwards
FC Spartak Trnava players
FC Petržalka players
MFK Zemplín Michalovce players
2. Liga (Slovakia) players
Slovak Super Liga players